The Somerset County Rugby Football Union (SCRFU) is the governing body for the sport of rugby union in the county of Somerset in England. The union is the constituent body of the Rugby Football Union (RFU) for Somerset. The SCRFU administers and organises rugby union clubs and competitions in the Somerset including the county rugby representative teams.

History 
The first Somerset rugby team played against Devon at Taunton in the 1875–76 season and the Somerset County Rugby Football Union was founded at a meeting in Bridgwater in September 1882. The county men's senior team has reached the County Championship final on five occasions, winning in their first final in 1923 but losing the remaining four.  They currently play in Division 2.

Honors
 County Championship winners: 1923

Affiliated clubs
There are currently 57 clubs affiliated with the Somerset RFU, most of which have teams at both senior and junior level, and are based in Somerset as well as parts of Bristol.

 Avon
 Avondale
Bath
 Bath Old Edwardians
 Bath Saracens
 Bath Spa University College
 Blake Bears
 Bridgwater & Albion
 Bristol Barbarians 
 Bristol Harlequins 
 Burnham-on-Sea 
 Butleigh Amateurs 
 Castle Cary  
Chard
 Cheddar Valley 
 Chew Valley  
 Clevedon 
 Combe Down  
 Crewkerne  
 Evercreech Barbarians 
 Frome 
 Gordano  
 Hornets
 Imperial  
 Keynsham  
 Martock  
 Midsomer Norton 
 Milborne Port 
 Millfield Old Boys  
 Minehead Barbarians
 Morganians  
 Nailsea and Backwell 
 North Petherton  
 North Wootton  
 Old Alruedians  
 Old Bristolians
 Old Culverhaysians 
 Old Redcliffians
 Old Sulians 
 Oldfield Old Boys  
 Somerton  
 St. Bernadette's Old Boys 
 St. Brendan's Old Boys  
 Stothert & Pitt
 Taunton Titans
 Tor 
 University of Bath
 Walcot 
 Wellington 
 Wells
 Weston-super-Mare
 Wincanton 
 Winscombe
 Wiveliscombe 
 Wyvern 
 Yatton 
 Yeovil

County club competitions 

The Somerset RFU currently runs the following club competitions for club sides in Somerset and parts of Bristol:

Leagues

Somerset Premier - league ranked at tier 8 of the English rugby union system)
Somerset 1 - tier 9 league
Somerset 2 North - tier 10 league
Somerset 2 South - tier 10 league
Somerset 3 North - tier 11 league
Somerset 3 South - tier 11 league

Cups
Somerset Senior Cup - for club sides that typically play between tiers 4-7 of the English rugby union league system.
Somerset Senior Vase - open to club sides that typically play between tiers 7-9.

Notes

See also
 :Category:Somerset County RFU players

References

External links 
 

Rugby union governing bodies in England
1882 establishments in England
Rugby union in Somerset